Herbert Randle may refer to:
 Harry Randle (Herbert Clarence Randle), English footballer
 Herbert Niel Randle, professor of philosophy and writer on Indian philosophy